Cosmin Gîrleanu (born 3 June 1999) is a Romanian boxer. He competed in the men's flyweight event at the 2020 Summer Olympics., as well as winning a gold medal at the 2015 Junior World Championships.

References

External links
 

1999 births
Living people
Romanian male boxers
Olympic boxers of Romania
Boxers at the 2020 Summer Olympics
Sportspeople from Hunedoara
Southpaw boxers
European Games competitors for Romania
Boxers at the 2019 European Games